Héctor Benjamín "Benji" Joya Jiménez (born September 22, 1993) is an American professional soccer player who plays as a midfielder.

Club career

Santos Laguna
Joya, who is of Mexican descent grew up in the Bay Area of California, played in the USSF Development Academy for De Anza Force. In early 2012, he joined Santos Laguna's organization. He began playing during the 2012 Clausura with the club's U-20 team. In September 2012, the midfielder made his first team debut in a Liga MX match.

Chicago Fire
Joya was loaned to Chicago Fire with an option to buy ahead of the 2014 MLS season. In the 2014 season opener, he made his MLS debut as a 63rd-minute substitute with his side was down 2–0. Seconds after making his way onto the field, a shot deflected by the Chivas USA keeper landed in front of him. He scored a left-footed shot inside the six yard box to put the Fire on the board, making it 2–1. That was Joya's first MLS touch and only league goal of the season.

Club Necaxa
Joya was loaned to Necaxa of the Ascenso MX for 2015–16.

Sporting Kansas City
Joya signed with Sporting Kansas City on September 15, 2016, before the MLS roster freeze.

Irapuato
On January 10, 2018, Joya signed with Mexican club Irapuato.

Oakland Roots SC
In April 2019, Joya signed with NISA expansion club Oakland Roots SC. He played in six of the team's games during both the Fall and Spring seasons. On September 8, 2019, Joya scored his first goal for Oakland against Liga MX side FC Juárez in an international friendly at Laney College, which the Roots lost 4–2.

On April 16, 2020, while the NISA season was on hiatus due to the COVID-19 pandemic, Joya was released from Oakland following an arrest the previous day.

International career
Joya was a member of the United States U-20 squad at the 2013 FIFA U-20 World Cup.

References

External links
 

1993 births
Living people
American soccer players
American expatriate soccer players
Santos Laguna footballers
Chicago Fire FC players
Sporting Kansas City players
Liga MX players
Major League Soccer players
National Independent Soccer Association players
American sportspeople of Mexican descent
Soccer players from San Jose, California
Expatriate footballers in Mexico
United States men's under-20 international soccer players
United States men's under-23 international soccer players
American expatriate sportspeople in Mexico
Association football midfielders
Irapuato F.C. footballers
Club Necaxa footballers
Oakland Roots SC players
De Anza Force players